Risk International, founded in 1986,  is a risk management consulting firm. It services clients in the areas of outsourced risk management, claims recovery, insurance archaeology, benefits advisement, actuarial services, loss prevention and mitigation. Headquartered in Fairlawn, Ohio, the company also has offices in Charlotte, North Carolina, Charleston, South Carolina, London and Ho Chi Minh City.

Company Overview
In 2016, 2015, and 2010, Risk International has been recognized as one of the fastest-growing companies in Northeast Ohio as a member of the Weatherhead 100 presented by Case Western Reserve University’s Weatherhead School of Management with Ohio's Council of Smaller Enterprises (COSE). The firm was 28th on the 2016 Weatherhead 100 list.

In 2010, the firm received the Silver Circle Award for the Best Risk Management Consultant in Business Insurance's 2010 Readers Choice Awards for the fourth consecutive year. 

In 2011 the firm was ranked as the third largest independent U.S. risk management consultant by Business Insurance magazine.

History
Risk International's parent company was formed in 1985 when Zapata Corporation, an offshore drilling and marine services company, spun off its risk management department.  Under the direction of Del R. Jones, Risk International was organized and gained its first client in 1986 when BFGoodrich, now Goodrich Corporation, outsourced its entire risk management department to Risk International.

Because of its roots in the petrochemical industry Risk International's core competency was asset risk management and insurance claims resolution.  As Risk International continued to hire experienced legal and insurance industry executives, it expanded its capabilities to include insurance archaeology, loss prevention and enterprise risk management. Throughout the 1990s Risk International developed expertise in long-tail claims resolution with Fortune 500 companies.

During that period Risk International also did extensive research related to Holocaust survivor insurance claims culminating in testimony before the U.S. House of Representatives and the New York State Senate.

Risk International is headquartered in Fairlawn, Ohio where BFGoodrich, now Goodrich Corporation, maintained its worldwide headquarters. Risk International opened another office in Charlotte, North Carolina to support the growth in that region of the US marketplace.

In 2002, Del R. Jones retired from the business and Douglas L. Talley was named chairman and CEO of Risk international.  After seven years, Michael D. Davis was named CEO while Talley retained his title of chairman.

Today, Dave O'Brien serves as chairman of the board, Michael Davis as vice chairman and Doug Talley continues to serves as a member of the board. In 2010, Risk International opened its first international office in London to expand its capabilities in the European marketplace. Since then, Risk International has opened another international office in Ho Chi Minh City.

Awards and Rankings

2017 

 29th on Weatherhead 100 List

2016 
28th on Weatherhead 100 List
870 on INC. 5000 Fastest Growing Private Companies in America

2015 
39th on Weatherhead 100 List

2011 
3rd Largest Independent U.S. Risk Management Firm
Best's Recommended Expert Service Provider

2010
Business Insurance Readers Choice Silver Award
3rd Largest Independent U.S. Risk Management Firm
Weatherhead 100 Recipient

2009
Business Insurance Readers Choice Silver Award
3rd Largest Independent U.S. Risk Management Firm

2008
Business Insurance Readers Choice Silver Award
5th Largest Independent U.S. Risk Management Firm

2007
Business Insurance Readers Choice Second Runner-up

2006
3rd Largest Independent U.S. Risk Management Firm

In the News

Holocaust and Kristallnacht Victims

In 1998, Risk International's then vice-president Douglas L. Talley provided expert testimony and evidence before the New York State Senate and evidence before the U.S. House of Representatives related to the discovery and examination of historical documents related to Holocaust victims insurance policies. Based on this evidence, he asserted that the victims of the Holocaust were the target of a Nazi scheme to confiscate insurance benefits, and beginning with Kristallnacht, insurance companies conspired to deny claims to German Jews.

Upon conclusion of its investigations the United States Congress, New York Senate and other states passed legislation that paved the way for victims to recover monetary damages from still-existing companies and organizations.

International Expansion
In March, 2010, Risk International announced the opening of its first international office in London.  The UK-based team will serve its European clients and pave the way for growth within the E.U. market. Less than 18 months later, Risk International announced the opening of its second international office in Singapore. At the same time it announced a new site security service offering.

Further reading
 Proof Emerges of Insurer-Nazi Complicity, Amy S. Friedman, June 1, 1998, National Underwriter
 Insurance Archaeologists , Gene Linn, April 16, 1998, The Journal of Commerce
 Archaeologists unearth coverage for past liabilities, Mark A. Hofman, June 9, 1997, Business Insurance
 Environmental research helps clients see green, April 24, 1997, The Journal of Commerce

References

External links
Official Corporate Site
Weatherhead 100 Site

Management consulting firms of the United States
Management consulting firms of the United Kingdom
International management consulting firms
Privately held companies based in Ohio
Companies based in Cleveland
Consulting firms established in 1986
Risk management companies
1986 establishments in Texas